Moustapha N'Diaye (born July 12, 1984 in Paris, France) is a French basketball player who played for the French Pro A league club Nancy during the 2004-2005 season.

References

French men's basketball players
1984 births
Basketball players from Paris
Living people